Tampa Shipbuilding Company, or TASCO, was one of a number of shipyards in Tampa, Florida. It operated from 1917 to after World War II, closing in 1947.

History

Origins 
Originally Tampa Shipbuilding & Engineering Company, founded in 1917, the yard built ships under the United States Maritime Commission's pre-war long-range shipbuilding program. It was also called the Tampa Shipbuilding & Dry Dock Company. It would use the facilities of the Tampa Foundry & Machine Co. Tampa Foundry that ceased to exist in 1916. The Tampa Foundry was established in 1892 and was later incorporated in 1905.

World War II mobilization 
The company would borrow $750,000 dollars in 1938 from the Public Works Administration to help pay for the construction of a 10,000-ton dry dock that was being built. The drydock would end up being constructed and afterwards in 1939, they would be awarded a contract worth $8 million to build four cargo ships. The growth in the shipyard would result in about 2,000 new jobs being created and helped to combat unemployment in the city. They company would end up only producing one of the ships in the contract,  as the company would announce it was in bad financial shape.

As a result of the company going into a bad financial state, the Maritime Commission and Reconstruction Finance Corporation (that had assumed the PWA loan) to try and find new owners for the company, replacing Ernest Kreher. George B. Howell who worked for the Exchange National Bank would be encouraged by this to buy the company for $500. Howell would be charged by the US Accounting Office of illegally selling ships and overcharging the US Navy. Despite being charged, he would never be prosecuted. The shipyard was renamed to Tampa Shipbuilding Company (TASCO) after it was sold.

World War II activities 
During the war, TASCO was one of four other shipyards in Tampa. The other three being: Bushnell-Lyons, Tampa Marine and McCloskey. TASCO was the largest company that existed. A company newspaper did exist during World War II named the Tascozette.

African American workers who worked in shipyards were usually excluded from joining local unions as it was common during that time period to not accept them. Those in the shipyard who were African American usually worked as cooks, assistants, janitors and learners which were some of the only job positions they could take. The jobs available to African American workers were not unionized in general. The accomplishments of African American workers were rarely if never highlighted in the company newspapers of the shipyards in Tampa. 17% of workers at the shipyard were female making it twice the rate it was at the national level.

Apart from doing work at the shipyard during World War II, recreational activities were also provided for workers there. A bowling, softball and basketball league was created at the shipyard. Eventually a swim club and fencing club would be established along with volleyball, tennis and badminton would also being introduced. A radio program would be created by the management of the shipyard. An RCA recording would be broadcast from the Morale Department located in the yard originally being an hour long program at noon. The radio program would be expanded in October 1944 and would also include songs requested by employees.

Ships built during World War II 
Immediately before and during the United States entry into the Second World War the company built US Navy auxiliaries. At its peak, it was the largest employer in Tampa, employing 16,000 people. Tampa Shipbuilding closed after the war in 1947, and few traces remain of its facilities.

 9 of 72 s
  ... 
 plus 3 launched, cancelled and scrapped (772, 773, 774)
 24 of 123 
  ... 
  ... 
 3 of 5 s
  ... 
 7 of 7 s (C2)
  ...
 1 of 10 s
 
 2 of 2 s
 , 
 3 of 11 s 
  ... 
 4 of 11 s (conversions only)
  ... 
  (conversion only)
 APL-53 to APL-56

References

External links
Tampa Shipbuilding (TASCO), Tampa FL

Defunct shipbuilding companies of the United States
Companies based in Tampa, Florida
1917 establishments in Florida
American companies established in 1917